Nawab Muhammad Yusef Ali Khan Bahadur, KSI, (5 March 1816 – 21 April 1865) was a Nawab of the princely state of Rampur from 1855 to 1865. During the First War of Independence, he rendered many useful services to the Government of India by keeping the British supply and communication lines to Naini Tal open, rescuing fugitives and securing the town of Moradabad. For his service, he was granted extensive lands in Bareilly by the Viceroy of India, Lord Canning, was knighted in 1861 and given a 13-gun salute along with the style of His Highness. Finally, he was made a member of the Viceroy's Council. Despite this multitude of honours, Sir Yusef continued to preserve the Mughal artistic tradition by inviting musicians, scholars and artists of Bahadur Shah Zafar II's court to resettle at Rampur, including the great poet Ghalib. Dying at 49 in 1865, he was succeeded by his son, Sir Kalb Ali Khan Bahadur.

Shortly before he died, the Yusef Ali Khan promoted the formation of the  Bank of Rohilkund (or Bank of Rohilkhand),  over the objection of local moneylenders. It was established in 1862, just after the acceptance of limited liability for banks. The bank was the first promoted by a princely state. It too was a small bank and was amalgamated into the Oudh Commercial Bank, which failed in 1958.

Titles
1816-1855: Nawabzada Muhammad Yusef Ali Khan, Wali Ahad Bahadur
1855-1860: 'Ali Jah, Mukhlis ud-Daula, Nasir ul-Mulk, Amir ul-Umara, Nawab Muhammad Yusuf 'Ali Khan Bahadur, Mustaid Jang, Nawab of Rampur
1860-1861: 'Ali Jah, Farzand-i-Dilpazir, Mukhlis ud-Daula, Nasir ul-Mulk, Amir ul-Umara, Nawab Muhammad Yusuf 'Ali Khan Bahadur, Mustaid Jang, Nawab of Rampur
1861-1865: His Highness 'Ali Jah, Farzand-i-Dilpazir, Mukhlis ud-Daula, Nasir ul-Mulk, Amir ul-Umara, Nawab Sir Muhammad Yusuf 'Ali Khan Bahadur, Mustaid Jang, Nawab of Rampur, KSI

Honours
Knight Companion of the Order of the Star of India (KSI)-1861

References
 Tripathi, Dwijendra (2004) The Oxford History of Indian Business. (New York). 

Nawabs of India
Nawabs of Rampur
1816 births
1865 deaths
Indian Sunni Muslims
Knights Companion of the Order of the Star of India